is a Japanese football player who plays for Ventforet Kofu.

Club career statistics
Updated to end of 2018 season.

Achievements
Japanese Super Cup: 2014 runners-up

References

External links
Profile at V-Varen Nagasaki 
Profile at Renofa Yamaguchi FC
Profile at Yokohama F. Marinos 

 

1995 births
Living people
Association football people from Osaka Prefecture
People from Izumisano
Japanese footballers
J1 League players
J2 League players
J3 League players
Yokohama F. Marinos players
Renofa Yamaguchi FC players
V-Varen Nagasaki players
FC Gifu players
J.League U-22 Selection players
Ventforet Kofu players
Association football central defenders